Darmani Rock (born April 17, 1996) is an American professional boxer. As an amateur he won a gold medal at the 2014 Youth World Championships and silver at the 2014 Youth Olympics.

Professional career
Rock made his professional debut on May 13, 2016, scoring a first-round technical knockout (TKO) victory over Carlos Black at the D.C. Armory in Washington, D.C.

Professional boxing record

References

Living people
1996 births
American male boxers
Boxers from Philadelphia
Heavyweight boxers
Boxers at the 2014 Summer Youth Olympics